Neritopsis is a genus of sea snails in the subfamily Neritopsinae of the family Neritopsidae.

Species
Species within the genus Neritopsis include:
 † Neritopsis acutispira  A.E.M. Cossmann, 1886  
 Neritopsis aqabaensis Bandel, 2007
 Neritopsis atlantica Sarasúa, 1973
 † Neritopsis auerbachii (Trautschold, 1858) 
 † Neritopsis benacensis  Vacek, 1886 
 Neritopsis benoisti  A.E.M. Cossmann, 1899
 † Neritopsis bernayi  A.E.M. Cossmann, 1887 
 † Neritopsis bicarinata  E.A.L. Kittl, 1894  
 † Neritopsis brasili Symonds, Gain & Le Renard, 2020 
 † Neritopsis cancellatus  Moore 
 † Neritopsis carmenae Pacaud & Quaggiotto, 2011 
 † Neritopsis dumortieri  L.F. Conti & Szabó, 1989 
 † Neritopsis elegantissima  Hornes, 1853 
 † Neritopsis fabianii  Toni, 1912 
 † Neritopsis faizae  Abbass, 1972 
 † Neritopsis galeola  Stoppani, 1858  
 † Neritopsis gedrosiana Harzhauser, 2017 
  † Neritopsis glabrata  E.A.L. Kittl, 1894 
 † Neritopsis granulata G. B. Sowerby I, 1834 
 † Neritopsis incisa  Hudleston 
 Neritopsis interlirata Pease, 1868
 † Neritopsis kasei  S. Kiel & K. Bandel, 2004 
 † Neritopsis kotelnikensis Gerasimov, 1992 
 † Neritopsis moniliformis Grateloup, 1832 - type species, from Lower Miocene
 † Neritopsis opalina  Brusamien, 1909 
 † Neritopsis papodensis  J. Szabo, 1982 
 † Neritopsis parisiensis Deshayes, 1864 - from Eocene
 † Neritopsis philea  A.V.M.D. D'Orbigny, 1851 
 † Neritopsis planoplicatus  Tong & Erwin, 2001 
 † Neritopsis praeclara  Seguenza, 1885  
 † Neritopsis pulcella Pacaud & Quaggiotto, 2011 
 Neritopsis radula (Linnaeus, 1758)
 Neritopsis spinigera  J. Szabo, 1982  
 † Neritopsis toddi Symonds, Gain & Le Renard, 2020 
 † Neritopsis varicosa  Morris & J. Lycett 
 † Neritopsis vokesorum R.C. Hoerle, 1972
Species brought into synonymy
 † Neritopsis altavillensis Deshayes, 1857 : synonym of  † Neritopsis granulata G. B. Sowerby I, 1834 
 † Neritopsis defrancii Vieillard & Dollfus, 1875 †: synonym of  † Neritopsis granulata G. B. Sowerby I, 1834 
 Neritopsis finlayi Hoerle, 1974: synonym of Neritopsis atlantica Sarasúa, 1973
 † Neritopsis guerangeri Davoust, 1856 †: synonym of  † Naricopsina guerangeri (Davoust, 1856) (new combination)
 Neritopsis richeri Lozouet, 2009: synonym of Neritopsis interlirata Pease, 1868
 † Neritopsis semiplicata Issel, 1869 †: synonym of  † Vanikoro semiplicata (Issel, 1869) (original combination)

References

External links
 Grateloup [J.P.S.. (1832). Description d'un genre nouveau de coquille, appelé Neritopside. Actes de la Société Linnéenne de Bordeaux. 5: 125-131, 3 figs.]
  Lozouet, P. (2009). A new Neritopsidae (Mollusca, Gastropoda, Neritopsina) from French Polynesia. Zoosystema. 31(1): 189-198.

Neritopsidae
Extant Jurassic first appearances